Mark Leslie Smith Cooper  is a New Zealand jurist. He was appointed a High Court judge in 2004, and a judge of the Court of Appeal in 2014. He has been president of the Court of Appeal since 26 April 2022.

Biography
Cooper is of Ngāti Māhanga descent, an iwi of Waikato Tainui. He received his tertiary education at the University of Auckland, graduating with Bachelor of Laws (Hons) and Magister Juris (Dist) degrees in 1979. After university, he worked for Butler White & Hanna, where he became a partner in 1983; the law firm merged with Simpson Grierson where he remained a partner. From 1997, he practised as a barrister sole. He was principal legal advisor for three Auckland territorial authorities: Auckland City Council, North Shore City Council, and Rodney District Council. In the 2000 appointment round, he was appointed Queen's Counsel alongside six others.

In 2004, Cooper was appointed a high court judge by the attorney general, Margaret Wilson, and sat in Auckland from August that year. Following the 2011 Christchurch earthquake, Cooper was appointed by the government to chair the Canterbury Earthquakes Royal Commission; the other commissioners were engineers Ron Carter and Richard Fenwick. He was appointed a judge of the Court of Appeal in 2014, and was named to replace Stephen Kós as president of the Court of Appeal from 26 April 2022.

Cooper was on the executive of the Auckland Division of the Cancer Society of New Zealand. He was on the establishment board for Metrowater, which was formed in 1997 and has since been integrated into Watercare Services. Cooper was board member for the Museum of Transport and Technology and the Auckland Observatory and Planetarium Trust.

See also
 List of King's and Queen's Counsel in New Zealand

References

Living people
20th-century New Zealand lawyers
University of Auckland alumni
Court of Appeal of New Zealand judges
High Court of New Zealand judges
Year of birth missing (living people)
New Zealand King's Counsel
Ngāti Māhanga people
New Zealand Māori judges
New Zealand Māori lawyers
21st-century New Zealand judges